Ecdemus is a genus of moths in the subfamily Arctiinae. The genus was erected by Gottlieb August Wilhelm Herrich-Schäffer in 1855.

Species
Ecdemus carmania (Druce, 1883)
Ecdemus hypoleuca Herrich-Schäffer, [1855]
Ecdemus obscuratus Schaus, 1911

References

External links

Arctiinae